Cosmic Top Secret is a video game for PC and Mobile by Danish film- and game-production company Klassefilm.
Released November 15, 2018, the game follows the experiences of the heroine Agent T in her search for answers, concerning her parents' involvement in the Danish Defence Intelligence Service during the Cold War. The game was later released on PlayStation 4, Xbox One, and Nintendo Switch on May 21, 2021 by indie game publisher Nakana.io.

Story
Cosmic Top Secret is based on real documentary audio recordings made by Director Trine Laier. 
The recordings were made while she was trying to untangle the secrets of her father and mother's time in the Danish Intelligence.

Cosmic Top Secret is an autobiographical adventure video game about T. The player follows her journey to uncover the truth about her parents’ work with Danish Intelligence during the Cold War. What exactly was it that they did?

You must control T on her uncertain journey into adulthood and an atomic war that never happened but yet wounded a family. Surreal elements, human relationships, history, and secrecy come together to form a complex gaming experience.

Art style
The world of Cosmic Top Secret is made to look like a cutout/puppet-theatre. All the characters are flat 2D puppets put in a 3D world.
When moving the main character Agent T, she is rolled up in a paper ball, and moves along the ground, or is flicked into the air.

Development
Cosmic Top Secret was first shown under the Danish name of Yderst Hemmeligt in 2012, as a graduation project by director Trine Laier at the National Film School of Denmark.

In 2013 the game received funding from Danish Film Institute to further develop the idea of a documentary game and redesigning the game as an adventure game.

Accolades
The game has garnered some attention at shows and conferences around the world.

References

External links
 

Adventure games
2018 video games
Windows games
MacOS games
Android (operating system) games
IOS games